Mulberry Plantation could mean:

Mulberry Plantation (Moncks Corner, South Carolina)
Mulberry Plantation (Kershaw County, South Carolina), near Camden, South Carolina
Mulberry Grove Plantation, Fort Wentworth, Savannah, Georgia.